Molly O'Toole is an American reporter whose work focuses on immigration and security. In May 2020, O'Toole was one of the inaugural recipients of the Pulitzer Prize for Audio Reporting for her work with This American Life concerning the personal impact of the Remain in Mexico Policy.

Education
O’Toole studied English as an undergraduate at Cornell University, graduating cum laude in 2009, before earning a dual master's degree in journalism and international relations from New York University in 2011. At Cornell, she ran for the varsity cross country and track teams, and was an editor for The Cornell Daily Sun. O'Toole credits much of her journalism training to The Sun: "Everything I learned about journalism, and really about life, came from the Cornell Daily Sun," she said in an interview with Cornell's magazine.

Awards
 2020 – The Pulitzer Prize for Audio Reporting.

References

External links
 The Out Crowd
 
 Articles by Molly O'Toole at The Los Angeles Times
 Articles by Molly O'Toole at Foreign Policy

Pulitzer Prize winners for journalism
American women journalists
21st-century American journalists
New York University alumni
Cornell University alumni
Los Angeles Times people
Year of birth missing (living people)
Living people
21st-century American women